The University of Pernambuco (UPE; formerly , FESP) is a public state university located in Recife, Pernambuco, Brazil.

Every year almost 4,000 seats of UPE are offered in Brazilian's universities entry exam, the National High School Exam (ENEM). The competition rate is over 12 applicants for each seat, in general.

UPE is well positioned in brazilians universities rankings, such as Guia do Estudante and RUF, with most of its courses being between the 50 best of Brazil. In 2021, UPE was classified as the 45th best university of Brazil and the 100th best of Latin America by Times Higher Education University Rankings (THE).

History 
In 1965, the faculties of Medical Sciences of Pernambuco (founded in 1950), Dentistry of Pernambuco (1955), Sciences of the Administration of Pernambuco (1965) joined forces with the Polytechnic School of Pernambuco (1912) to form the initial nucleus of the "Pernambuco Higher Education Foundation - FESP", which became, at the beginning of the 1990s, into the "University of Pernambuco", acquiring public character and assuming its social role.

In addition, the School of Physical Education (founded in 1946) and the Faculty of Teacher Training of Garanhuns (1966), of Nazaré da Mata (1966) and of Petrolina (1968) joined the University of Pernambuco.

In 1976 was created the Institute of Biological Sciences of the University of Pernambuco, a centralizer unit to the basic disciplines of the courses of Medicine, Dentistry, Nursing and Physical Education.

In this way, the UPE has a decentralized campus in several cities of the state (Arcoverde, Caruaru, Garanhuns, Nazaré da Mata, Palmares, Petrolina, Salgueiro and Serra Talhada, in addition to having implemented distance courses of Public Administration, Biological Sciences, Letters and Pedagogy in the municipalities of Fernando de Noronha, Floresta, Garanhuns, Nazaré da Mata, Ouricuri, Palmares, Petrolina, Surubim and Tabira).

Structure

Pro-Rectors 
 Pro-Rectory of Extension and Culture - PROEC
 Pro-Rectory of Graduation - PROGRAD
 Pro-Rector of Graduate Studies and Research - PROPEGE
 Pro-Rectory of Institutional Development and Extension - PRODINE
 Pro-Rector's Office - PROADMI
 Pro-Rector of Planning - PROPLAN
 Attorney's Office - PROJUR

Support Units 
 Amaury de Medeiros Integrated Health Center - CISAM (founded in 1947)
 University Hospital Oswaldo Cruz - HUOC (founded in 1884)
 Cardiovascular Health Center of Pernambuco - PROCAPE (founded in 2006)
 Editora Universidade de Pernambuco - EDUPE
 Technological Innovation Institute - IIT

Academic Units and Courses Offered

Campus  Recife 
 ESEF - Superior School of Physical Education of the University of Pernambuco
 Physical Education
 FCAP - Faculty of Sciences of the Administration of Pernambuco
Administration
Law
 FCM - Faculty of Medical Sciences of Pernambuco
Medicine
 Collective Health
 FENSG - Faculty of Nursing Nossa Senhora das Graças
Nursing
 Social Sciences (Bachelor)
 FOP - Faculty of Dentistry of Pernambuco
Dentistry
 ICB - Institute of Biological Sciences of the University of Pernambuco
Biological Sciences
 POLI - Polytechnic School of Pernambuco
Civil Engineering
Computer Engineering
 Control and Automation Engineering
 Electrical / Electrotechnical Engineering
 Electrical / Electronic Engineering
Telecommunication Engineering
 Industrial Mechanical Engineering
 Materials Physics (Bachelor)

Campus  Arcoverde 
Law
Dentistry

Campus  Caruaru 
 FACITEC - Faculty of Sciences and Technology of Caruaru
 Administration
Information Systems

Campus  Garanhuns 
 FACETEG - Faculty of Sciences, Education and Technology of Garanhuns
Medicine
Biological Sciences
Geography
History
 Computing
 Letters (Portuguese and their Literatures)
Mathematics
Pedagogy
Psychology
Software Engineering

Campus  Nazaré da Mata 
 FFPNM - Faculty of Teacher Training of Nazaré da Mata
Biological Sciences
Geography
History
 Letters (Portuguese / English and their Literatures)
 Letters (Portuguese / Spanish and their Literatures)
Mathematics
Pedagogy
 Technological Management in Logistics

Campus  Palmares 
 Management in Logistics
Social Service

Campus  Petrolina 
 FFPP - Faculty of Teacher Training of Petrolina
 Biological Sciences
Nursing
Physiotherapy
 Geography
 History
 Letters (Portuguese and their Literatures)
 Letters (English and their literatures)
 Mathematics
Nutrition
 Pedagogy

Campus  Salgueiro 
Administration

Campus  Serra Talhada 

Medicine

References 

Pernambuco, Universidade de
Universities and colleges in Recife
Educational institutions established in 1966
1966 establishments in Brazil